Andhra Pradesh Southern Power Distribution Company Limited or APSPDCL is the Electricity Distribution company owned by the Government of Andhra Pradesh for the Nine Southern Districts of Andhra Pradesh namely Kurnool, Anantapur, Tirupati, Sri Sathya Sai, Kadapa, Annamayya, Chittoor, Nandyal and Nellore districts.

History

The Southern Power Distribution Company of Andhra Pradesh Ltd (APSPDCL) was incorporated under the Companies Act, 1956 as a Public Limited Company on 01-04-2000 with headquarters at Tirupati to carryout electricity distribution for the districts of Krishna, Guntur, Prakasam, Nellore, Chittoor and Kadapa. On 2 June 2014, due to bifurcation of the erstwhile Andhra Pradesh Anantapur and Kurnool districts were added to the Southern Power Distribution Company of AP Ltd.

AP Power Sector Reforms envisage creation of Distribution Companies as Government Undertakings. The Andhra Pradesh Gazette No.37 published by the Government of Andhra Pradesh on Friday 31 March 2000 declared formally formation of Distribution Companies. In this process, Andhra Pradesh Southern Power Distribution Company was formed for the following six districts of Andhra Pradesh. The corporate office and headquarters of APSPDCL is at Tirupati City

Quality power at economic rates acts a catalyst in transforming the state by fostering growth in agricultural, industrial and commercial areas while meeting the increasing domestic demand. On Feb 1, 1999, Government of Andhra Pradesh initiated the first phase of reforms and restructuring in AP's power sector by unbundling APSEB into APGENCO and APTRANSCO to cater to Generation and Transmission & Distribution respectively. APTRANSCO was further reorganized into four distribution companies to cater to the needs to the different districts of AP.

APSPDCL was formed on April 1, 2000 to serve Krishna, Guntur, Prakasam, Nellore, Chittoor and Kadapa districts.

After the bifurcation of the erstwhile Andhra Pradesh into the two new states of Andhra Pradesh and Telangana on 2 June-2014, two more districts Anantapur and Kurnool were added to the Southern Power Distribution Company of AP Ltd.

APSPDCL Network

APSPDCL encompasses an area of Nine districts viz. 
SPDCL DISCOM Details up to 31-07-2019.

S.No. 	Details 	
1 	Area in Sq. km 	118119
2 	No. of Domestic Services 	9412063
3 	No. of Non Domestic & Commercial Services 	1000677
4 	No. of LT Industrial Services 	74784
5 	No. of Collage Industries and Dhobighats Services 	17097
6 	No. of Agricultural Services 	1475846
7 	No. of P W S & Street Light Services 	117829
8 	No. of General Purpose Services 	82955
9 	No. of Aqua & Animal Husbandry & others Services 	55320
10 	No. of Temporary Services 	1026
11 	No. of LT Services 	12237597
12 	No. of HT Services 	7116
13 	No. of 33/11 KV Substations 	2228
14 	No. of Distribution Transformers 	784330
15 	No. of 11 KV Feeders 	8589
16 	No. Divisions 	48
17 	No. of Sub-Divisions 	166
18 	No. of Sections 	648
19 	No. of ERO's / Sub-ERO's 	132|}

See also
Andhra Pradesh Eastern Power Distribution Company Limited
Andhra Pradesh Central Power Distribution Company Limited
Andhra Pradesh Power Generation Corporation
Transmission Corporation of Andhra Pradesh

References

Electric power distribution network operators in India
Energy in Andhra Pradesh
State agencies of Andhra Pradesh
State electricity agencies of India
Energy companies established in 2000
Indian companies established in 2000
2000 establishments in Andhra Pradesh